Ander Vitoria Aguirre (born 22 January 1990) is a Spanish professional footballer who plays as a forward for Cultural Leonesa.

Club career
Born in Igorre, Biscay, Basque Country, Vitoria joined Athletic Bilbao's Lezama in 2000, aged ten. He made his senior debut with the farm team in 2007, in Tercera División, and subsequently served two loan stints at Segunda División B sides SD Lemona and SD Amorebieta.

Vitoria left the Lions in 2012, and signed for Club Portugalete in the fourth tier. After scoring a career-best 24 goals in the campaign, he signed for UE Sant Andreu in division three.

Vitoria continued to appear in the third division in the following years, representing SD Leioa, Burgos CF,  Barakaldo CF and UD Logroñés. He helped the latter in their first-ever promotion to Segunda División in 2020, scoring ten goals in 28 appearances (play-offs included).

Vitoria made his professional debut on 12 September 2020 at the age of 30, starting in a 0–1 away loss against Sporting de Gijón.

Honours
Spain U17
UEFA European Under-17 Championship: 2007

References

External links

1990 births
Living people
Sportspeople from Biscay
Spanish footballers
Footballers from the Basque Country (autonomous community)
Association football forwards
Segunda División players
Segunda División B players
Tercera División players
CD Basconia footballers
SD Lemona footballers
SD Amorebieta footballers
UE Sant Andreu footballers
SD Leioa players
Burgos CF footballers
Barakaldo CF footballers
UD Logroñés players
Spain youth international footballers
Athletic Bilbao footballers
Club Portugalete players